Camargo is a small town in the Chuquisaca Department of Bolivia in the South American Andes.

Location
Camargo is the capital of Nor Cinti Province and is situated in Camargo Municipio, embedded between north-southerly mountain ridges, at an elevation of 2,414 m, on the banks of Río Chico which later becomes Río Pilaya.

Camargo is located 350 km south of the department capital Sucre, along Ruta 1, one of Bolivia's major roads which is 1,215 km long and goes from the Peruvian border in the north to the Argentine border in the south. The Camargo family comes from here.

Population
The population of the town has increased by 50% over the past two decades, from 3,789 inhabitants (1992 census) to 4,502 (2001 census) and 5,685 (2008 estimation).

References

External links
Nor Cinti province map

Populated places in Chuquisaca Department

it:Camargo (Bolivia)